Ram Chandra Paudel (Nepali: राम चन्द्र पौडेल; born 15 October 1944) is a Nepalese politician serving as the third President of Nepal since March 2023. A former senior leader of the Nepali Congress, Paudel was elected president on 9 March 2023.

Political life
In the 2008 Constituent Assembly election he was elected from the Tanahu-2 constituency, winning 18,970 votes. He was elected as the Leader of the Parliamentary Party of the Nepali Congress on June 20, 2009, securing 61 votes against Sher Bahadur Deuba, a former Prime Minister who received 48 votes.

Poudel is a senior leader and central committee member of the Nepali Congress who served as Acting President of the Nepali Congress after the death of party president Susil Koirala. He was actively involved in party organization for many years as a central committee member and vice-president.

Personal life
Poudel was born on 15 October 1944  into a higher class farmer's family in the remote village of Satiswara, located in the Tanahun district of western Nepal. He is married and has five children: four daughters one son.

Education
M.A. (1970) in Nepali literature from Tribhuvan University, Kathmandu, appeared in the examination while being detained the jail as an anti-panchayat leader.

SASTRI  (1967) in Sanskrit literature from Tribhuvan University.

Publications
Poudel received numerous literary awards on various debates and essay competitions. 

He writes frequently political and theoretical affairs which are being published in national vernaculars.

He received Mahendra Bikram Shah Prize in 1987 on an article entitled "Human Rights Condition in Nepal".

He has published the following books:  

 What Nepali Congress Says (1976)
 Satyagraha – Why and How (1984)
 Democratic Socialism – A study (1990)
 Journey of Faith (1996)
 Abhisapta Etihas (2004)
 Socialism – In New Context (2012)
 Agricultural Revolution and Socialism (2013)

Early Political career 

 Greatly affected by the unconstitutional dissolution of parliament and the dismissal of the duly elected government led by B.P. Koirala in December, 1960 and decided to be involved in the movement for the restoration of democratic rights in the early age of 16.
 Associated with the Armed Insurrection Movement for the restoration of democracy and seize of Bharatpur/Chitwan in 1961.
 Initiated Free Student Movement in 1962.
 Elected President of the Saraswati College Student Union in 1966.
 Elected as a founder President of the Gandaki Student committee in 1966.
 Elected as the General Secretary of the Democratic Socialist Youth League (DSYL) in 1967.
 Took important initiative in organizing Nepal Student Union 1970 and elected as a Senior member of the committee of the Union.
 Elected as a member of the Nepali Congress Tanahun District Committee in 1977.
 Elected as a vice-president of the Nepali Congress Tanahun District Committee in 1979.
 Elected as a president of the Tanahun District Multy Party Campaigning committee in 1980.
 Made the coordinator of the Nepali Congress's Central Publicity Committee in 1983.
 Appointed as a member of the Central Committee of the Nepali Congress and was made the chief of its central level Publicity Bureau in 1987.
 Elected as a Member of Parliament from Tanahun Constituency No. 1 be defeating Nepal communist Party (United People's Front) Candidate with large margin. (1991)
 Served as the Minister for Local Development & Agriculture from May 29, 1991, to 1994.
 Elected as a Member of Parliament from Tanahun Constituency No. 2 by defeating Nepal Communist Party (UML) Candidate by huge Margin from general election held in 1994.
 Elected as the speaker of House of representatives (lower house) in 1994 and served until 1998.
 Served as the Minister for Home and Deputy Prime Minister of Nepal in 1999 to 2002.
 Made the coordinator of Peace Secretariat that included representative from top political parties. (2006-2007)
 Served as the Minister for Peace and Reconstruction in, 2007 to 2008
 Made the General Secretary of the Nepali Congress's Central Committee in 2006.
 Made the vice-president of the Nepali Congress's Central Committee in 2007.
 Elected as a Member of Constituent Assembly from Tanahun Constituency No. 2 by defeating Nepal Communist Party (Maoists) Candidate from elections 2008.
 Elected as Parliamentary Party Leader of Nepali Congress party by defeating 3 times prime minister of Nepal and leader Sher Bahadur Deuba, 2008.
 Made the Vice President of Nepali Congress after being elected as Central Working Committee Member of the party in 12th General Assembly of the party in 2009. Served as Acting President of the Nepali Congress Party. Role after the demise of Sushil Koirala.
 Elected as a Member of Constituent Assembly from Tanahun Constituency No. 2 by defeating Nepal Communist Party (UML) Candidate from 2nd CA Elections held in 2013. Also elected as member of parliament from 2022 elections. He is now 6th term serving as parliamentarian in Nepal.
 Elected as the President of Nepal on 9th March 2023.
 Resigned from all the responsibility of Nepali Congress as the post of President is independent.

Jail years
Spent all over 15 years as a prisoner of conscience on various occasions being an opponent of dictatorial panchayat regime (while leading campaigns against King's directly imposed ruling system).

(a) 1962-  Detained for 10 months in connection with the armed seize of bharatpur by Nepali Congress.

(b) 1964- Detained for 12 months in connection with the student movement in Kathmandu.

(c) 1966- Detained for 6 months for being involved in the movement to oust the then Deputy inspector General of Police.

(d) 1967- Detained for 14 months in connection with the organizational activities of DSYL in Pokhara.

(e) 1969 – Detained for one year in Kathmandu in connection with the reorganization of DSYL in Western Nepal.

(f) 1970- Detained for 3 months in Kathmandu for being involved in the organization and inauguration of Nepal Student Union.

(g) 1971 to 1975- Detained for 4 years for being active in revitalizing political activities after the release of the late B.P. Koirala

(h) 1977- Detained for 10 months for being involved in the Patan Conference of the Nepali Congress where the decision was taken to launch a civil disobedience movement (Satyagraha) for the restoration of democracy and the release of the ailing leader B.P. Koirala.

(i) 1979- Detained for 6 months for taking lead role in the movement which ultimately ushered in the referendum to make a choice between multi-party democracy or party-less Panchayat constitution (panchayats were councils organized at the local level, presumably to ensure the representation of citizens. However, the king exercised much stronger authority than in the 1959 constitution and could modify the constitution or suspend it in case of emergency.)

(j) 1981- Detained for 6 months in connection with the boycott of the elections held as per the party less Panchayat constitution.

(k) 1985 – Detained for 9 months in connection with the civil disobedience movement (Satyagraha)

(l) 1988 – Detained for 3 months on the charge of publishing Nepali Congress organ and for breaching publication Act under Panchayat System.

(m) 1989 – Detained for 5 months in Baglung on the charge of organizing and inspiring people to take part on the Movement for the Restoration of Democracy.

(n) 2003-2005 – Detained for about one and half years in total after Kings directly imposed rule by former King Gyanendra Bikram Shah after the Royal Palace Massacre in 2001.

(o) Numerous other minor detentions during Panchayat system.

Honors
 : Grand Cordon of the Order of the Rising Sun (2020)  for contributions in enhancing Nepal-Japan ties

References

External links
 Facebook page

1944 births
Living people
People from Tanahun District
Nepali Congress politicians from Gandaki Province
Speakers of the House of Representatives (Nepal)
Government ministers of Nepal
Grand Cordons of the Order of the Rising Sun
Nepal MPs 1991–1994
Nepal MPs 1994–1999
Nepal MPs 1999–2002
Members of the 1st Nepalese Constituent Assembly
Members of the 2nd Nepalese Constituent Assembly
Nepal MPs 2022–present
Candidates for President of Nepal
Presidents of Nepal